This is a list of Medal of Honor recipients for World War II. The Medal of Honor was created during the American Civil War and is the highest military decoration presented by the United States government to a member of its armed forces. The recipient must have distinguished themselves at the risk of their own life above and beyond the call of duty in action against an "enemy of the United States" or an "opposing foreign force". Due to the nature of this medal, it is commonly presented posthumously.

World War II, or the Second World War, was a global military conflict, the joining of what had initially been two separate conflicts. The first began in Asia in 1937 as the Second Sino-Japanese War; the other began in Europe in 1939 with the German and Soviet invasion of Poland. This global conflict split the majority of the world's nations into two opposing military alliances: the Allies and the Axis powers.

The United States was drawn into World War II on December 8, 1942, a day after the Axis-member Japan launched a surprise attack on Pearl Harbor in Honolulu that killed almost 2,500 people in what was considered the biggest peacetime loss on American soil inflicted by foreign people at that time.

For actions during World War II, 472 United States military personnel received the Medal of Honor. Seventeen of these were Japanese-Americans fighting in both Europe and the Pacific, many of which were upgraded from Distinguished Service Crosses during the Clinton administration. Additionally, Douglas Albert Munro was the only serviceman from the United States Coast Guard in United States military history to receive the Medal for his actions during the war.

The earliest action for which a U.S. serviceman earned a World War II Medal of Honor was the attack on Pearl Harbor, for which 17 U.S. servicemen were awarded a Medal, although they did so "while engaged in military operations involving conflict with an opposing foreign force" rather than "enemy" since the United States was neutral during the events of December 7, 1941. The last action to earn a contemporaneous Medal of Honor prior to the August 15, 1945, end of hostilities in World War II, were those of Melvin Mayfield, on July 29, 1945 – though several honorees may have been cited for their Medal after Mayfield's recognition on May 31, 1946. Additionally, seven African Americans and twenty-two Asian American veterans who had received the Distinguished Service Cross during the war were awarded the Medal of Honor in 1997 and 2000 – most of them posthumously – after two studies determined that racial discrimination had caused them to be overlooked at the time.

A

B

C

D

E

F

G

H

I

J

K

L

M

N

O

P

R

S

T

U

V

W

Y

Z 

 N.B. A  in the citation indicates that the award was given posthumously.

See also 
 The Unknown American Soldier from World War II

Notes

References 
 
 
 
 
 
 
 
 

World War II

Medal Of Honor